Pseudorhynchus is an Asian genus of bush crickets in the tribe Copiphorini, belonging to the 'conehead' subfamily Conocephalinae.

Distribution
Species of Pseudorhynchus have been recorded from: eastern mainland Africa, Madagascar, tropical Asia through to Australia and the Pacific islands.

Species
The Orthoptera Species File lists:
Pseudorhynchus acuminatus Redtenbacher, 1891
Pseudorhynchus antennalis Stål, 1877
Pseudorhynchus calamus Rehn, 1909
Pseudorhynchus concisus Walker, 1869
Pseudorhynchus cornutus Redtenbacher, 1891
Pseudorhynchus crassiceps Haan, 1842
Pseudorhynchus crosskeyi Ragge, 1969
Pseudorhynchus flavescens Serville, 1831
Pseudorhynchus flavolineatus Redtenbacher, 1891
Pseudorhynchus froggatti Kirby, 1906
Pseudorhynchus gigas Redtenbacher, 1891
Pseudorhynchus hastatus Bolívar, 1890
Pseudorhynchus hastifer Schaum, 1853
Pseudorhynchus inermis Karny, 1907
Pseudorhynchus japonicus Shiraki, 1930
Pseudorhynchus lanceolatus Fabricius, 1775 - type species (as P. sicarius Serville)
Pseudorhynchus lessonii Serville, 1838
Pseudorhynchus mimeticus Redtenbacher, 1891
Pseudorhynchus minor Redtenbacher, 1891
Pseudorhynchus nobilis Walker, 1869
Pseudorhynchus porrigens Walker, 1869
Pseudorhynchus pungens Schaum, 1853
Pseudorhynchus raggei Bailey, 1980
Pseudorhynchus robustus Willemse, 1953
Pseudorhynchus selonis Bailey, 1980

References

External links 
 

Conocephalinae
Tettigoniidae genera
Orthoptera of Africa
Orthoptera of Asia